

Toponymy 
Blagoveshchensky (masculine), Blagoveshchenskaya (feminine), or Blagoveshchenskoye (neuter) may refer to:
Blagoveshchensky District, name of several districts in Russia
Blagoveshchenskoye, Kazakhstan, a locality in Aktobe Province, Kazakhstan
Blagoveshchensky, Russia (Blagoveshchenskaya, Blagoveshchenskoye), name of several rural localities in Russia

People 
 Nikolai Blagoveshchensky (1837–1889), a Russian writer, journalist and ethnographer.